Fred Jefferson Burrell (March 12, 1889 – October 15, 1955) was a Massachusetts businessman and politician who served in the Massachusetts House of Representatives and as Treasurer and Receiver-General of Massachusetts from January 21, 1920 – September 3, 1920.

1917 Massachusetts Constitutional Convention 
In 1916 the Massachusetts legislature and electorate approved a calling of a Constitutional Convention.  In  May 1917, Burell was elected to serve as a member of the Massachusetts Constitutional Convention of 1917, representing the 26th Middlesex District of the Massachusetts House of Representatives.

Massachusetts Treasurer
Elected Treasurer in 1919, Burrell resigned from the position on September 3, 1920, following an investigation by a special legislative committee, which revealed that banks using the services of an advertising agency owned by Burrell received increased amounts of state money. Burrell was also criticized for depositing $125,000 of state funds with Hanover Trust Company, a bank run by Charles Ponzi.

Burrell denied any wrongdoing and ran for Treasurer five more times after his resignation, losing to Charles F. Hurley in 1930, John E. Hurley in 1944 and 1950, Roy C. Papalia in the 1952 Republican primary, and Laurence Curtis in the 1956 Republican primary.

See also
 1917 Massachusetts legislature
 1918 Massachusetts legislature
 1919 Massachusetts legislature

References

1889 births
1955 deaths
Politicians from Medford, Massachusetts
Members of the 1917 Massachusetts Constitutional Convention
Republican Party members of the Massachusetts House of Representatives
State treasurers of Massachusetts
20th-century American politicians